Dayrell may refer to:

Alice Dayrell Caldeira Brant (1880–1970), Brazilian juvenile writer
Anthony Walter Dayrell Brooke, (1912–2011), appointed His Highness the Rajah Muda of Sarawak on 25 August 1937
Bertram Willes Dayrell Brooke (1876–1965), member of the family of White Rajahs who ruled Sarawak for a hundred years
Lillingstone Dayrell, village in Buckinghamshire, England